RMS Manx Maid may refer to two ships of the Isle of Man Steam Packet Company:

 
 

Packet (sea transport)
Ship names